James Lindsay (28 August 1880 – 1925) was an English professional footballer who launched his career as a full back. He played over 250 matches in the Football League, predominantly for Bury. Lindsay was part of the Bury team that won the FA Cup in 1903. They defeated Derby County 6–0 in the final, which remains the record winning margin for the final.

Lindsay's brother, Billy, was also a professional footballer, and played with him at Newcastle.

References 

1880 births
1925 deaths
Footballers from Stockton-on-Tees
Footballers from County Durham
English footballers
Association football fullbacks
Jarrow F.C. players
Newcastle United F.C. players
Burnley F.C. players
Bury F.C. players
English Football League players
FA Cup Final players